Coulter is a city in Franklin County, Iowa, United States. The population was 219 at the 2020 census.

History
Coulter got its start in the 1880s, following construction of the Chicago & Great Western Railway through that territory.

Geography
Coulter is located at  (42.734311, -93.369173).

Demographics

2010 census
At the 2010 census there were 281 people, 107 households, and 76 families living in the city. The racial makeup of the city was 87.2% White, 0.4% African American, 12.1% from other races, and 0.4% from two or more races. Hispanic or Latino people of any race were 14.9%.

Of the 107 households 37.4% had children under the age of 18 living with them, 55.1% were married couples living together, 6.5% had a female householder with no husband present, 9.3% had a male householder with no wife present, and 29.0% were non-families. 26.2% of households were one person and 11.2% were one person aged 65 or older. The average household size was 2.63 and the average family size was 3.12.

The median age was 34.5 years. 29.5% of residents were under the age of 18; 8% were between the ages of 18 and 24; 24.6% were from 25 to 44; 27.3% were from 45 to 64; and 10.7% were 65 or older. The gender makeup of the city was 55.2% male and 44.8% female.

2000 census
At the 2000 census there were 262 people, 105 households, and 66 families living in the city. The racial makeup of the city was 96.18% White, 3.82% from other races. Hispanic or Latino people of any race were 4.20%.

Of the 105 households 29.5% had children under the age of 18 living with them, 51.4% were married couples living together, 8.6% had a female householder with no husband present, and 37.1% were non-families. 27.6% of households were one person and 9.5% were one person aged 65 or older. The average household size was 2.50 and the average family size was 3.14.

The age distribution was 27.9% under the age of 18, 7.6% from 18 to 24, 26.3% from 25 to 44, 20.6% from 45 to 64, and 17.6% 65 or older. The median age was 37 years. For every 100 females, there were 114.8 males. For every 100 females age 18 and over, there were 110.0 males.

The median household income was $35,208 and the median family income  was $38,958. Males had a median income of $26,538 versus $20,625 for females. The per capita income for the city was $14,056. About 13.4% of families and 18.4% of the population were below the poverty line, including 36.3% of those under the age of eighteen and none of those sixty five or over.

Education
The CAL Community School District operates public schools serving Coulter.

References

Cities in Iowa
Cities in Franklin County, Iowa
1880s establishments in Iowa